Walk and Talk is a 2009 computer-animated short film produced by WaterMelon Studios, Kochi. The film was directed jointly by Binoy Mathew and Sajeev Kumar. The premiere took place at The Third International Documentary and Short Film Festival of Kerala 2010, in the competition section of animation films.

Premise
When a person is engaged in a conversation on the mobile phone, it leaves the other person feeling left out.

Production
Walk and Talk is the second directorial venture of Binoy Mathew and Sajeev Kumar whose first project is a 3D animation short film titled, The Stealth. It  was selected for ATHENS ANIMFEST of 2009. Only two films were selected from India for Athens Anim Fest'09.

References

2009 films
Indian animated short films
2000s English-language films